The Alliance for Change (AB) is a defunct right-wing Christian-democratic political party in Malta. It is eurosceptic and has expressed socially conservative stances. It was led by Ivan Grech Mintoff, who in 2021 founded ABBA Party. Although the party's social media has not been updated since 2019, as of 2022 Alleanza Bidla still remains a registered political party.

2017 parliamentary election

After going through the judicial system, Alleanza Bidla were able to nominate a total of four candidates to contest on two electoral districts each.

The names of the candidates (along with the electoral districts that they contested on) were:

 Ivan Grech Mintoff (1st and 12th district)
 Elizabeth (k/a Claire) Mikkelsen (9th and 10th district)
 Joseph Giardina (7th and 12th district)
 Saviour (Sonny) Xeureb (6th and 11th district)

Election results

General elections

European Parliament elections

References

Political parties in Malta
Catholic political parties
Christian democratic parties in Europe
Conservative parties in Malta
Eurosceptic parties in Malta
European Christian Political Movement